Derick Recaldo Parry (born 22 December 1954) is a former cricketer from St Kitts and Nevis who played 12 Tests and six One Day Internationals for the West Indies.

Parry was a lower-order right-handed batsman and a right-arm off-break bowler.

Parry's international career came to an end after he joined the rebel tours to South Africa in 1982–83 and 1983–84, defying the international sporting boycott of the apartheid state.

Parry spent 15 seasons between 1981 and 1996 as the professional at Horden CC in the Durham Senior League, missing only the 1992 season in this spell.

References

1954 births
Living people
Combined Islands cricketers
Leeward Islands cricketers
West Indies One Day International cricketers
West Indies Test cricketers
Nevisian cricketers
Cambridgeshire cricketers
Saint Kitts and Nevis expatriate sportspeople in England